The men's triathlon at the 2020 Summer Olympics took place at the Odaiba Marine Park in Tokyo on 26 July.

The race began with a false start, as a media boat blocked about a third of the field from entering the water. After the restart, the field remained close together coming out of the water. In the cycling leg, a group of 10 broke away for the first few laps but the chasing pack eventually reeled them by the end of the fifth lap to form a lead group of 37 triathletes. On the last lap, Andrea Salvisberg broke away solo to lead by 16 seconds heading into the second transition, but he was caught by the rest of the field on the first lap of the running leg. The lead group remained together until the end of the third lap, when Alex Yee, Kristian Blummenfelt, and Hayden Wilde surged ahead. In the final mile, Blummenfelt accelerated away from the other two to take the gold medal. Yee finished 11 seconds later to take the silver, with Wilde completing the podium a further nine seconds back.

Course 
Competitors began with a  swimming leg, consisting of a  lap followed by a shorter  lap. Then, they took on the  cycling leg, made of eight laps of a  course. Finally, competitors finished with four  laps that made up the  running leg.

Results

Notes

References 

Men
Men's events at the 2020 Summer Olympics